Beinn Dearg Mòr is a Corbett in the middle of the Fisherfield Forest, near Dundonnell and Northwest Highlands in Scotland.

Beinn Dearg Mòr and Beinn Dearg Bheag, its neighbour, sit across the Loch na Sealga (also referred to as na Sheallag) from An Teallach, "The Anvil."

References

Corbetts
Mountains and hills of the Northwest Highlands
Marilyns of Scotland